William Bentley MacLeod (born 1954) is a Canadian-American economist.  He is the Sami Mnaymneh Professor of Economics and Professor of International and Public Affairs at Columbia University and an Affiliated Faculty at Columbia Law School. He is a specialist in the fields of law, labor and contract theory.

Education 
MacLeod received a B.A.  with distinction in Mathematics from Queen's University in 1975 and an M.Sc. in Mathematics from Queen's University in 1979. He completed his economics doctorate at the University of British Columbia in 1984.

Academic career 
He began his teaching career at Queen's University, then he taught at Université de Montréal, Boston College, University of Southern California, California Institute of Technology and Princeton University, before coming to Columbia University. He has also held one year visiting positions at Center for Operations Research and Econometrics(Belgium), Instituto de Análisis Económico(Barcelona), Princeton University, the Russell Sage Foundation and the Institute for Advanced Study.
He was elected fellow of the Econometric Society in 2005, and fellow of the Society of Labor Economists in 2012. He is also the recipient of the 2002 H. Gregg Lewis prize awarded by the Society of Labor Economists for his article "Worker Cooperation and the Ratchet" with H. Lorne Carmichael. He was President of the Society of Institutional and Organizational Economics in 2017-18, and is Secretary Treasurer of the American Law and Economics Association.

Notable publications 
 "Implicit Contracts, Incentive Compatibility, and Involuntary Unemployment" by MacLeod and Malcomson
MacLeod, W. Bentley, and James M. Malcomson. "Investments, Holdup, and the Form of Market Contracts." The American Economic Review 83, no. 4 (1993): 811-37, https://www.jstor.org/stable/2117580
MacLeod, W. Bentley. "Reputations, Relationships, and Contract Enforcement." Journal of Economic Literature 45, no. 3 (2007): 595-628. www.jstor.org/stable/27646841.
 "First Do No Harm? Tort Reform and Birth Outcomes" mentioned in Tort Reform.
 "Optimal Contracting with Subjective Evaluation," American Economic Review: Vol. 93 No. 1 (March 2003).
 "Performance Pay and Wage Inequality", Quarterly Journal of Economics, 2009, Vol. 124, Issue 1 (joint with T. Lemieux and D. Parent)
 "Administrative Corruption and Taxation", by Frank Flatters and W. Bentley Macleod. Reprinted in "The Economics Of Corruption And Illegal Markets".

Personal life 
MacLeod is married to Janet Currie, an economist at Princeton University.
They have two children.

References

External links 
 W. Bentley MacLeod's homepage
 Worldcat Identities MacLeod, W. Bentley (William Bentley) 1954–

1954 births
Canadian economists
Columbia University faculty
Labor economists
Living people
University of British Columbia alumni
Fellows of the Econometric Society